Zyxomma multinervorum is a species of dragonfly in the family Libellulidae, 
known as the large duskdarter. 
It is a stout and short-bodied dragonfly with dull-coloured markings. It has been found in north-eastern Australia,
New Guinea and the Maluku Islands.

Gallery

See also
 List of Odonata species of Australia

References

Libellulidae
Odonata of Australia
Insects of New Guinea
Insects of Indonesia
Taxa named by George Herbert Carpenter
Insects described in 1897